The 2020 Munster Senior Hurling Championship was the 133rd staging of the Munster Senior Hurling Championship since its establishment by the Gaelic Athletic Association in 1888. The championship fixtures were announced on 10 October 2019, with the championship due to take place between 10 May and 28 June 2020. However, due to the impact of the COVID-19 pandemic on Gaelic games, the draw for a rescheduled championship took place on 26 June 2020 with a new knock-out format being adopted, re-scheduled to take place between 24/25 October and 14/15 November 2020. The championship format returned to the round-robin league in 2022. 

Limerick were the defending Munster champions. They retained their title, beating Waterford in the final by 4 points. The same two teams went on to contest the All-Ireland hurling final on 13 December, when Limerick won again, this time by 11 points.

Teams

The Munster championship was contested by five of the six counties from the Irish province of Munster. The exception was Kerry, traditionally the province's weakest at hurling (but strongest in football).

Personnel and general information

Bracket

Fixtures

Quarter-final
This game is also the 2020 National Hurling League final.

Semi-finals

Final

See also
 2020 All-Ireland Senior Hurling Championship
 2020 Leinster Senior Hurling Championship
 2020 Joe McDonagh Cup

References

Munster
Munster Championship
Munster Senior Hurling Championship